Coronado High School (CHS) is a public high school in Coronado, California. It is the only high school in the Coronado Unified School District.

The California Department of Education gave it a California Distinguished School award in 2011 and two Model Continuation High School awards in 2014 and 2018.

The Coronado School of the Arts (CoSA) is located on the campus of CHS.

The boundary includes Naval Amphibious Base Coronado and Naval Air Station North Island.

History 
Coronado High School was established in 1913. In 1939, the original building was knocked down and rebuilt as part of Franklin Delano Roosevelt's Works Progress Administration. It was renovated again in 1961 and 2006.

In the 1970's, a group of students led by former Spanish teacher Lou Villar developed what became a $100-million dollar worldwide drug smuggling operation.

In 2008, the school was named a National Blue Ribbon School. CHS was the only school in San Diego County to win the award.  In 2016, CHS was ranked 433rd nationally and 70th amongst California high schools in the USNews list of "Best High Schools", out of more than 27,000 public high schools.  It was awarded the New American High Schools designation in 1998. It offers Advanced Placement Classes.

Sports
Coronado Sports, with the exception of Water Polo, Swimming, Tennis, Volleyball, Golf, Basketball, Cross Country, Baseball, and Softball are played at Niedermeyer Field which was completed in 2000. The Field, which hosts Football, Boys and Girls Soccer, and Boys and Girls Lacrosse was upgraded to field turf in 2005. The campus includes an aquatics complex named the Brian Bent Memorial Aquatics Complex., Three Coronado High School graduates played on the United States waterpolo team for the 2008 Olympics. In 1996, Adrian Taufaasau, a Coronado High quarterback, was tackled in a game and suffered what later was termed blunt force trauma to his head and neck, dying two days later.
In 2007, Tennis Coach and Teacher Robbin Adair coached the Islanders to his 1,000th win.

Tortilla throwing incident 
On June 20, 2021, the boys' basketball team forfeited the CIF Division 4A Regional Basketball Championship after members of the team threw tortillas at their predominantly Latino opponents from Orange Glen High School during a victory celebration after the championship game.  The move, which had previously been condemned by the League of United Latin American Citizens, prompted an investigation by the San Diego County’s Human Relations Commission. The Coronado Unified School District  apologized for "racism and classism" and fired head coach J.D. Laaperi over the incident. A 40-year-old alumni of the school who had no children of his own on the team or at the school claimed that he distributed the tortillas to team members and cheerleaders because tortilla throwing was a tradition at UC Santa Barbara where he and Laaperi attended at the same time. The UCSB Alumni Association has said tortilla throwing has had to be banned because of game interruptions and "associations with racist ideology." This followed an effort in 2020 to ensure that the school districts curriculum not be updated to include a focus on racial justice. On July 6, the school board voted to "initiate litigation" thereby "enabling the Superintendent to enter the appeal process within the 15 day window," claiming their independent investigation "found no evidence warranting forfeiture of the title."

Notable graduates 

Layne Beaubien – water polo player, 2004, 2008 & 2012 Olympics
Lisa Bruce – film producer, The Theory of Everything (2014 film)
Don Davis – Florida politician
Ken Huff – former American football offensive lineman in the National Football League.
Genai Kerr – water polo player, 2004 Olympics
James Maslow - actor, dancer, model, singer
Karlyn Pipes - decorated Masters-level swimmer and author
Alan G. Poindexter – NASA astronaut
Nick Reynolds – founding member of The Kingston Trio
Jesse Smith – Olympic water polo player
William Witney – movie director

References

External links 
http://chs.coronadousd.net

High schools in San Diego County, California
Coronado, California
International Baccalaureate schools in California
Public high schools in California
Educational institutions established in 1913
1913 establishments in California

es:Coronado High School